Georges Pisani (16 April 1918 – 17 March 2008) was a French sailor. He competed in the Star event at the 1960 Summer Olympics.

References

External links
 

1918 births
2008 deaths
French male sailors (sport)
Olympic sailors of France
Sailors at the 1960 Summer Olympics – Star
Sportspeople from Algiers
20th-century French people